Terrence Edward Kennedy (born June 4, 1956) is a former All-Star Major League Baseball catcher who played for the St. Louis Cardinals (1978–80), San Diego Padres (1981–86), Baltimore Orioles (1987–88) and San Francisco Giants (1989–91). Kennedy batted left-handed and threw right-handed. He is the son of former major league player and manager Bob Kennedy.

Early life
Born in Euclid, Ohio, Kennedy attended St. Mary's High School (Phoenix, Arizona) before playing college baseball at Florida State University. He was a two-time All-American and Sporting News College Player of the Year in 1976. Kennedy was inducted into the FSU Athletics Hall of Fame in 1982.

Career
In a 14-year major league career, Kennedy hit .264 with 113 home runs and 628 RBI in 1491 games. Kennedy tied Johnny Bench's NL mark of 40 doubles in a season in 1982. That same year, Kennedy won the Silver Slugger Award. He appeared in four All-Star Games (1981, 1983, 1985, and 1987). He also played in two World Series, with the Padres in 1984 and with the Giants in 1989.  Terry and his father, Bob, became the first father and son duo to drive in runs in a World Series when Terry drove in two against the Tigers in 1984 in his first at bat.

Throughout most of his career, Kennedy wore #16, which he was assigned on his first day in major league camp with the Cardinals. When he came to the Orioles, he could not get #16 because veteran pitcher Scott McGregor already had the number, so he wore #15 during his time with them. He reverted to #16 during his time with the Giants, during which he took part in the earthquake-interrupted 1989 World Series.

After his playing days, Kennedy managed, coached, and instructed in the minor leagues for the St. Louis Cardinals, Montreal Expos, Seattle Mariners, Chicago Cubs, Los Angeles Dodgers and San Diego Padres, as well as the Independent Leagues. Kennedy was voted Manager of the Year twice, including Baseball America Manager of the Year in 1998, when he led the Iowa Cubs to a first-place finish.

Kennedy is a scout with the Chicago Cubs.

See also
 List of second-generation Major League Baseball players

External links
, or Retrosheet, or Encyclopedia of Baseball Catchers, or SABR Biography Project

1956 births
Living people
American League All-Stars
Arkansas Travelers players
Baltimore Orioles players
Baseball players from Ohio
Chicago Cubs scouts
Florida State Seminoles baseball players
Iowa Cubs managers
Johnson City Cardinals players
Las Vegas 51s managers
Major League Baseball catchers
National League All-Stars
People from Euclid, Ohio
Portland Beavers managers
San Antonio Missions managers
San Diego Padres players
San Francisco Giants players
Silver Slugger Award winners
Springfield Redbirds players
St. Louis Cardinals players
St. Petersburg Cardinals players
Anchorage Glacier Pilots players

pt:Terry Kennedy